Eric John Logan McInnes  is a British chemist and a Professor in the Department of Chemistry at The University of Manchester. His research in general is based on inorganic chemistry and magnetochemistry, specifically on molecular magnetism, EPR spectroscopy and coordination chemistry.

Education 
McInnes completed his Bachelor of Science and Doctor of Philosophy degree at University of Edinburgh in 1992 and 1995 respectively. His PhD on Physico-chemical studies of co-ordination complexes of the platinum group metals was supervised by Lesley Yellowlees.

Research and career 
After graduating, McInnes completed his postdoctoral research with David Collison and F.E. Mabbs at University of Manchester from 1995 - 1998 before moving to University of East Anglia to take up a postdoctoral research with A.K. Powell and A.J. Thomson in 1999. He then moved back to University of Manchester as a Lecturer and was promoted to Chair of inorganic chemistry in 2007.

McInnes's research in general is based on inorganic chemistry and magnetochemistry, specifically on molecular magnetism, EPR spectroscopy and coordination chemistry.

Apart from research and lecturing, McInnes was also the Chair in the 50th, 51st and 52nd international meeting of the Royal Society of Chemistry ESR group. He also was a discussant in the Keynote lecture's held at the Asian Pacific EPR Symposium and International Conference on Coordination Chemistry which was held in 2018. McInnes also holds an author profile in Angewandte Chemie. He is also part of the Molecular Magnetism Group at University of Manchester along with Nicholas F. Chilton, Richard Winpenny, David Collison, Grigore Timco and Floriana Tuna.

Notable work 

In 2016, McInnes confirmed the capability to use pulsed EPR spectroscopy to measure the covalency of actinide complexes in a research in collaboration with Floriana Tuna and David P. Mills at the University of Manchester. Prior to this research, the extent of covalency in actinide complexes was less understood as this nature of bonding was not studied due to limited technology and methods of experimentation at the time. The use of pulsed EPR spectroscopy was able to determine the covalency of thorium(III) and Uranium(III) complexes for the first time and this paved the way to further research on the use of these complexes in the separation and recycling of nuclear waste.

Awards and nominations 
 Tilden Prize (2019) 
 Elected a Fellow of the Royal Society of Edinburgh (FRSE) in 2019
 International EPR Society Medal for Chemistry (2015)

Major Publications

References

Living people
British chemists
Academics of the University of Manchester
21st-century chemists
Fellows of the Royal Society of Edinburgh
Alumni of the University of Edinburgh
Year of birth missing (living people)